This is a list of football clubs in Sweden, for women's football clubs, see the list of women's football clubs in Sweden.

League listings 

 Allsvenskan
 Superettan
 Division 1
 Division 1 Norra
 Division 1 Södra
 Division 2
 Division 3
 Division 4
 Division 5
 Division 6
 Division 7
 Division 8

Alphabetical listings 

Contents: A  B  C  D  E  F  G  H  I  J  K  L  M  N  O  P  Q  R  S  T  U  V  W  X  Y  Z  Å  Ä  Ö

O 

See also:

Footnotes

References